Cian Coleman (born 1 January 1997) is an Irish professional footballer playing for League of Ireland Premier Division club, Cork City. He has previously played for St Patrick's Athletic, Limerick and Cobh Ramblers for a season each, having started his career at his local club, Cork City.

Club career

Cork City
Coleman joined Cork City in 2013 aged 16, just after having spent time on trial with Aston Villa. He played for the clubs' under 19 side for four seasons alongside the likes of Chiedozie Ogbene, Aaron Drinan and Conor McCarthy among others. His first season saw Cork win the league, the third year in a row for the side. in 2015, they retained their title with a win over Limerick at Markets Field.
Coleman made his first appearance for the senior team aged 18 on 31 August 2015 as he came on as a substitute for Kevin O'Connor in a 3–1 win over St Patrick's Athletic at Turners Cross.
2016 saw Coleman make 2 further appearances for the first team, in games against Wexford and Bray Wanderers. He captained the under 19 side to the Enda McGuill Cup, beating St Patrick's Athletic in the final and qualifying for the UEFA Youth League in the process. Coleman impressed in the UEFA Youth League, as he captained the side to a 1–0 win on aggregate against HJK Helsinki of Finland before losing 3–1 at home and 1–0 away to Italian giants AS Roma.

Cobh Ramblers
With Coleman facing an uphill battle for playing time in the first team at Cork City with midfield options of Gearoid Morrissey, Greg Bolger, Garry Buckley, Conor McCormack and Jimmy Keohane, Coleman opted to join Cobh Ramblers in the League of Ireland First Division in March 2017. Coleman's first senior career goal came on 18 March 2017 in a 5–1 win over Athlone Town at St Colman's Park. His first season in senior football under Stephen Henderson saw Coleman rack up as many as 27 appearances in all competitions, scoring 4 goals.

Limerick
Coleman made the step back up to the League of Ireland Premier Division when he signed for Limerick on 7 November 2017. Upon signing for Limerick, Coleman stated that manager Neil McDonald played a huge part in his decision to sign for the club. The season turned out to be a disaster for the club however, as McDonald departed in January before the season started, replaced by Tommy Barrett. The club struggled with financial difficulties which resulted in players leaving in the summer transfer window and ultimately saw the in a relegation fight for the entire season. Coleman however impressed with his performances throughout the season. He amassed 35 appearances and 2 goals across all competitions in his first season at Premier Division level which included playing both legs of the Promotion/relegation playoffs, which saw Limerick beaten by Finn Harps, resulting in relegation for the blues.

St Patrick's Athletic
On 27 November 2018, Coleman signed for Dublin club St Patrick's Athletic for the 2019 season. He made his debut on the opening night of the season on 15 February 2019 in a 1–0 win over his former side Cork City at Richmond Park. Coleman had to wait until 31 May for his first start in the league, also against Cork City, in which he set up Simon Madden's 95th minute equaliser in a 1–1 draw. This performance helped Coleman claim his place in Harry Kenny's starting 11 over the next number of games, just before Pats' UEFA Europe League campaign. Coleman got his first taste of European football at senior level as he played both legs of the tie as Pats were knocked out of the UEFA Europa League at the first hurdle by IFK Norrköping of Sweden, losing 2–0 at home and 2–1 away. He was released at the end of the season after making 26 appearances in all competitions, failing to score a goal in his time with the club.

Return to Cork City
On 7 November 2019, it was announced that Coleman had returned to his hometown club Cork City ahead of the 2020 season.

Career statistics 
Professional appearances – correct as of 1 February 2023.

References

External links
 
 
 

1997 births
Living people
People from County Cork
Association footballers from County Cork
Cork City F.C. players
Cobh Ramblers F.C. players
Limerick F.C. players
St Patrick's Athletic F.C. players
League of Ireland players
Association football midfielders
Republic of Ireland association footballers